Thomas Miles Birkett (May 27, 1872) was an Ontario merchant and political figure. He represented Ottawa South in the Legislative Assembly of Ontario from 1926 to 1929 as a Conservative Party of Ontario member.

He was born in Ottawa, the son of Thomas Birkett, and educated at the Ottawa Collegiate Institute. In 1896, he married Lyla Dealty Parlow. He operated a wholesale hardware business established by his father.

References 
 Canadian Parliamentary Guide, 1928, AL Normandin

External links 
Member's parliamentary history for the Legislative Assembly of Ontario

1872 births
Year of death unknown
Lisgar Collegiate Institute alumni
Liberal-Conservative Association of Ontario